John Grigg (21 April 1828 – 5 November 1901) was a 19th-century Member of Parliament in Canterbury, New Zealand.

Grigg was born in Bodbrane, Cornwall, England, on 21 April 1828 and baptised in the nearby Duloe two days later.

He briefly represented the Wakanui electorate from 23 July 1884 to 4 June 1885, when he resigned.

References

1828 births
1901 deaths
Members of the New Zealand House of Representatives
New Zealand MPs for South Island electorates
British emigrants to New Zealand
New Zealand people of Cornish descent
English emigrants to New Zealand
19th-century New Zealand politicians